Abdelkarim Hassan Al Haj Fadlalla (born 28 August 1993) is a Qatari professional footballer who plays as a left-back for Kuwaiti Premier League club Al-Jahra and the Qatar national team.

Abdelkarim won the Asian Footballer of the Year award in 2018.

Club career

Abdelkarim Hassan graduated from Aspire Academy in 2011.

He was the youngest player to appear in the 2011 AFC Champions League at 17 years old, coming off the bench against Esteghlal. His team subsequently emerged champions of the Champions League that year. He was awarded Young Player of the Year in the 2012–13 Qatar Stars League. It was announced in June 2017 that Al Sadd had loaned him to Belgian First Division A side Eupen.

Abdelkarim played in the 2019 FIFA Club World Cup, in which he scored in a 3–1 win over Hienghène Sport. He later scored in the second round 3–2 loss against C.F. Monterrey. Al-Sadd eventually finished in the 5th place.

On 21 December 2022, the management of Al Sadd announced that Abdelkarim Hassan has been excluded from the football first team permanently. This comes due to the player’s outlook not matching the goals and aspirations of the team for the upcoming period. On 25 January 2023, Abdelkarim Hassan joined for Kuwaiti Premier League club Al-Jahra.

International career

Youth teams
Abdelkarim scored a goal against UAE U20 in the 10th International Friendship Youth Tournament.

In a friendly match against the Malaysia U-23 side on 17 June 2012, Abdelkarim sparked a mass melee between the two sides after a two-footed lunge on Mohd Azrif in the 43rd minute. He was duly shown a red card for his challenge. Afterwards, a Malaysian player, Nazmi Faiz, ran half the length of the pitch to confront him, and punched him. Being 5 inches shorter than Abdelkarim, Nazmi's punch turned into nothing more than a push on his chest. Nazmi Faiz was shown a red card, whereas Qatar went on to lose 2–0.

He scored a goal in Qatar's opening game against Maldives in the qualifying stage for the 2014 AFC U-22 Asian Cup.

Senior team
Abdelkarim made his debut for the senior national team on 18 November 2010 against Haiti.

He was the youngest player to appear in the preliminary squad list for the 2011 Asian Cup at the age of 17 years and 123 days old. He scored Qatar's only goal against Malaysia in the 2015 AFC Asian Cup qualifiers to ensure Qatar a berth in the Asian Cup. He also scored a goal in Qatar's 4–1 victory against Yemen in the qualifiers.

Though his team lost all their group stage games in the 2015 AFC Asian Cup, he was extolled as one of the stars of the tournament. A FIFA.com featured article theorized that he would form the basis of young players who go on to represent Qatar at the 2022 FIFA World Cup.

He was named part of Qatar's squad for the 23rd Arabian Gulf Cup held in Kuwait in from December 2017 to January 2018.

He was part of Qatar's squad at 2019 AFC Asian Cup which helped them to win their first continental title. On 30 March 2021, he played his 100th match for Qatar in a 1–1 friendly match against the Republic of Ireland.

Career statistics

Club

1Includes Emir of Qatar Cup.
2Includes Sheikh Jassem Cup.
3Includes AFC Champions League.

International goals
Qatar score listed first, score column indicates score after each Hassan goal.

Honours

Al-Sadd
Qatar Stars League: 2012–13, 2018–19, 2020–21, 2021-22
Emir of Qatar Cup: 2014, 2015, 2017, 2020, 2021
Qatar Cup: 2017, 2020, 2021
Sheikh Jassim Cup: 2014, 2019
Qatari Stars Cup: 2019-20
AFC Champions League: 2011
FIFA Club World Cup Third place: 2011

Qatar U23
GCC U-23 Championship: 2011

Qatar
AFC Asian Cup: 2019
Arabian Gulf Cup: 2014

Individual
Asian Footballer of the Year: 2018
AFC Asian Cup Team of the Tournament: 2019

See also
List of men's footballers with 100 or more international caps

References

External links

1993 births
Living people
Al Sadd SC players
K.A.S. Eupen players
Qatari footballers
Qatari expatriate footballers
Qatar international footballers
Qatar Stars League players
2015 AFC Asian Cup players
2019 Copa América players
2019 AFC Asian Cup players
2021 CONCACAF Gold Cup players
Association football defenders
Footballers at the 2010 Asian Games
Aspire Academy (Qatar) players
AFC Asian Cup-winning players
Asian Games competitors for Qatar
Asian Footballer of the Year winners
Qatari people of Sudanese descent
Sudanese emigrants to Qatar
Naturalised citizens of Qatar
Expatriate footballers in Belgium
Qatari expatriate sportspeople in Belgium
Expatriate footballers in Kuwait
Qatari expatriate sportspeople in Kuwait
Kuwait Premier League players
Al Jahra SC players
FIFA Century Club
Qatar youth international footballers
Qatar under-20 international footballers
2022 FIFA World Cup players